Noel MacNeal (born September 15, 1961), sometimes credited as Noel McNeal or Edward Noel MacNeal, is an American puppeteer, actor, director and writer of children's television who has performed since the early 1980s. He was the voice and puppeteer of Bear on Bear in the Big Blue House. He also starred as Kako on Oobi, Leon MacNeal on The Puzzle Place and as Magellan on Eureeka's Castle.

Career
Noel portrays the environmentally friendly character ZoZo a mascot for safer streets, green transportation, and useful public spaces. This Jim Henson designed and created walk around puppet is used by Livable Streets Education to talk about these issues with young children and families.

While Bear is his most famous character, MacNeal has also performed Mrs. (Mommy) Snuffleupagus and various Snuffleupagus relatives on Sesame Street, Magellan, a baby dragon, on the ACE Award-winning series Eureeka's Castle on Nick Jr, Leon MacNeal in The Puzzle Place, Raphael in Teenage Mutant Ninja Turtles III and Madame Chairbird in the Sesame Street film Follow That Bird. His repertoire of characters also includes Kako on the Nick Jr. series Oobi, Blue on Nick Jr.'s Blue's Room, Rabbit for The Disney Channel's Emmy Award-winning series The Book of Pooh, Lionel on PBS's Between the Lions, and Knock-Knock on The Great Space Coaster. In addition, he’s performed with and/or for Woody Allen, Bill Cosby, Whoopi Goldberg, Jerry Lewis, Mickey Rooney, Emma Thompson, Wayne Brady, Dave Chappelle, Donny and Marie Osmond, Tom Bergeron, Regis and Kelly, Matt Lauer and Katie Couric.

Noel is also a television writer. His scripts have been featured on PBS Kids Sprout's The Good Night Show, The Disney Channel's Bear in the Big Blue House, PBS's The Puzzle Place, The Magic School Bus and Cyberchase, TLC's Salty's Lighthouse (in which he re-wrote an original episode of the British children's TV series Tugs for its own segments) and Nickelodeon's Eureeka's Castle and Gullah Gullah Island. He is also a script and television directorial adviser and consultant for the international versions of Sesame Street as well having directed episodes of Bear in the Big Blue House and PBS Kids Sprout's The Good Night Show.

In 2003, Noel received a Daytime Emmy Nomination as "Outstanding Performer in a Children’s Series". Noel is now the resident puppeteer for the HBO series Last Week Tonight with John Oliver. MacNeal was noted for his portrayal of Mr. Nutterbutter, and operated a seagull puppet in another episode. He also portrayed Totes McGoats, a goat-human hybrid mascot which promotes recycling, in the episode on plastics.

Personal life
MacNeal was born to a white father and an African-American mother.

On November 6, 1999, he married author Susan Elia at Manhattan's Union Theological Seminary. In 2005, their son Matthew was born.

Filmography

Puppeteer 
 1983: The Great Space Coaster: Knock-Knock (First-run Syndication)
 1983: Sesame Street (TV Show; TV Specials): Mommy Snuffleupagus, Gretel, Additional Muppets (1983–present)
 1985: Follow That Bird: Madame Chairbird
 The Muppets (1985–present)
 Little Muppet Monsters: Rat, Magic Book
 Holiday Greetings from the Ed Sullivan Show
 Muppet Meeting Films: Pastry and Injured Employee
 Muppet Treasure Island (Muppet Sing-Alongs)
 A Muppets Christmas: Letters to Santa: Sweetums
 The Muppets Take the Bowl: Sweetums (puppetry only)
 The Muppets Take the O2
 1989: Eureeka's Castle: Magellan and Webster (Nick Jr.)
 1990: The Cosby Show (episode: Cliff's Nightmare), Cheese (NBC)
 1991: Dinosaurs (ABC)
 1992: Dog City (series): Doctor, Police Officer (FOX)
 1993: CityKids (ABC)
 1993: Teenage Mutant Ninja Turtles III: Raphael (face performance)
 1995: The Puzzle Place: Leon MacNeal, Blue Piece Police (Seasons 1&2) (PBS)
 1996: Kids for Character: Leon MacNeal
 1997: Bear in the Big Blue House: Bear, Moss, Billy (Playhouse Disney)
 1999: Cosby (episode: My Spy), puppet (CBS)
 2000: Oobi: Kako (Noggin)
 2001: The Book of Pooh: Rabbit (Playhouse Disney)
 2002: Oz: (Miss Sally's Schoolyard) (HBO)
 2002: Playhouse Disney (UK): Bear
 2004: Chappelle's Show: "Knee High Park" (puppeteer and consultant) (Comedy Central)
 2004: LazyTown: Pixel (Defeeted only originally)
 2009: Between the Lions: Lionel Lion (Season 9-10), Monkey (Under Construction), Beetles Member, Squeaky the Wheel (PBS Kids)
 2009: Old Dogs
 2014: Last Week Tonight with John Oliver: Puppeteer (HBO)
 2015: The Show Me Show: Fynnias
 2015: Unbreakable Kimmy Schmidt (episode: Kimmy's in a Love Triangle!) (Netflix)
 2017: Julie's Greenroom: Additional characters (Netflix)

Writer
 Cyberchase
 The Magic School Bus
 Salty's Lighthouse (Tugs segments, one episode only)
 The Puzzle Place
 Gullah Gullah Island
 Eureeka's Castle
 A Very Special Goodnight Show
 Nate the Great
 Bear in the Big Blue House
 Breakfast with Bear
 The Good Night Show

Director
 Bear in the Big Blue House
 The Good Night Show

References

External links
 Official Website
 
 

1961 births
Living people
20th-century American male actors
21st-century American male actors
African-American male actors
American puppeteers
American male television actors
American male television writers
American television directors
American television writers
Male actors from New York City
Muppet performers
Screenwriters from New York (state)
Sesame Street Muppeteers